Li is a classical Chinese word which is commonly used in Chinese philosophy, particularly within Confucianism.  Li does not encompass a definitive object but rather a somewhat abstract idea and, as such, is translated in a number of different ways. Wing-tsit Chan explains that li originally meant "a religious sacrifice, but has come to mean ceremony, ritual, decorum, rules of propriety, good form, good custom, etc., and has even been equated with natural law."

In Chinese cosmology, human agency participates in the ordering of the universe by Li ('rites'). There are several Chinese definitions of a rite. One of the most common definitions is that it transforms the invisible to visible; through the performance of rites at appropriate occasions, humans make visible the underlying order. Performing the correct ritual focuses, links, orders, and moves the social, which is the human realm, in correspondence with the terrestrial and celestial realms to keep all three in harmony. This procedure has been described as centering, which used to be the duty of the Son of Tian, the emperor. But it was also done by all those who conducted state, ancestral, and life-cycle rites and, in another way, by Daoists who conducted the rites of local gods as a centering of the forces of exemplary history, of liturgical service, of the correct conduct of human relations, and of the arts of divination such as the earliest of all Chinese classics—the Book of Changes (Yi Jing)—joining textual learning to bodily practices for health and the harmonized enhancement of circuits of energy (qi).

Scope
The rites of li are not rites in the Western conception of religious custom. Rather, li embodies the entire spectrum of interaction with humans, nature, and even material objects. Confucius includes in his discussions of li such diverse topics as learning, tea drinking, titles, mourning, and governance. Xunzi cites "songs and laughter, weeping and lamentation...rice and millet, fish and meat...the wearing of ceremonial caps, embroidered robes, and patterned silks, or of fasting clothes and mourning clothes...unspacious rooms and very nonsecluded halls, hard mats, seats and flooring" as vital parts of the fabric of li.

Approaches to Li
Among the earliest historical discussions on li occurred in the 25th year of Duke Zhao of Lu (517 BCE) in the Zuo Zhuan.

Li consists of the norms of proper social behavior as taught to others by fathers, village elders and government officials. The teachings of li promoted ideals such as filial piety, brotherliness, righteousness, good faith and loyalty. The influence of li guided public expectations, such as the loyalty to superiors and respect for elders in the community.

Continuous with the emphasis on community, following li included the internalization of action, which both yields the comforting feeling of tradition and allows one to become "more open to the panoply of sensations of the experience" (Rosemont 2005). But it should also maintain a healthy practice of selflessness, both in the actions themselves and in the proper example which is set for one's brothers. Approaches in the community, as well as personal approaches together demonstrate how li pervades in all things, the broad and the detailed, the good and the bad, the form and the formless. This is the complete realization of li.

The rituals and practices of li are dynamic in nature. Li practices have been revised and evaluated throughout time to reflect the emerging views and beliefs found in society. Although these practices may change, which happens very slowly over time, the fundamental ideals remain at the core of li, which largely relate to social order.

Li in government
Confucius envisioned proper government being guided by the principles of li. Some Confucians proposed the perfectibility of  human beings with learning Li as an important part of that process. Overall, Confucians believed governments should place more emphasis on li and rely much less on penal punishment when they govern.

Confucius stressed the importance of the rites as fundamental to proper governmental leadership. In his sayings, Confucius regarded feudal lords in China that adopted the Chinese rites as being just rulers of the Central States. Contrarily, feudal lords that did not adopt these rites were considered uncivilized, not worthy of being considered Chinese or part of the Central States (Spring and Autumn Annals).

Li should be practiced by all members of the society. Li also involves the superior treating the inferior with propriety and respect. As Confucius said "a prince should employ his minister according to the rules of propriety (Li); ministers should serve their prince with loyalty" (Analects, 3:19).

In quotations
Li is "one term by which the [traditional Chinese] historiographers could name all the principles of conservatism they advanced in the speeches of their characters."

See also
 Li (neo-Confucianism)
 Zhou ritual system
 Ritual and music system
 Confucian ritual religion

References 

Concepts in Chinese philosophy
Confucian rites
Principles
Concepts in ethics
Etiquette